Amanda Township is one of the thirteen townships of Fairfield County, Ohio, United States. As of the 2010 census, the population was 2,706, up from 2,429 people at the 2000 census. Of the total township population, 1,969 lived in the unincorporated portions of the township

Geography
Located in the southwestern part of the county, it borders the following townships:
Bloom Township - north
Greenfield Township - northeast corner
Hocking Township - east
Madison Township - southeast corner
Clearcreek Township - south
Washington Township, Pickaway County - southwest
Walnut Township, Pickaway County - west
Madison Township, Pickaway County - northwest corner

The village of Amanda is located in southeastern Amanda Township, and the unincorporated community of Royalton lies in the northern part of the township.

Name and history
Amanda Township took its name from Fort Amanda.  Statewide, other Amanda Townships are located in Allen and Hancock counties.

Government
The township is governed by a three-member board of trustees, who are elected in November of odd-numbered years to a four-year term beginning on the following January 1. Two are elected in the year after the presidential election and one is elected in the year before it. There is also an elected township fiscal officer, who serves a four-year term beginning on April 1 of the year after the election, which is held in November of the year before the presidential election. Vacancies in the fiscal officership or on the board of trustees are filled by the remaining trustees.

References

External links
 County website

Townships in Fairfield County, Ohio
Townships in Ohio